Re Smith and Fawcett Ltd. [1942] Ch 304 is a UK company law case, concerning the meaning of "the interests of the company". It is relevant for the provisions of company law now embodied in Companies Act 2006, section 172.

Facts
Article 10 of the company's constitution said that directors could refuse to register share transfers. Mr. Fawcett, one of the two directors and shareholders, had died. Mr. Smith co-opted another director and refused to register a transfer of shares to the late Mr. Fawcett’s executors. Half the shares were bought, and the other half offered to the executors.

Judgment
Lord Greene MR said:

See also
Business judgment rule
Australian Securities and Investments Commission v Rich [2009] NSWSC 1229

United Kingdom company case law
Court of Appeal (England and Wales) cases
1942 in case law
1942 in British law